In a Temple Garden is an album by American multi-instrumentalist and composer Yusef Lateef recorded in 1979 and released on the CTI label.

Track listing
All compositions by Jeremy Wall except where noted.
 "In a Temple Garden" –  5:15
 "Bismillah" – 4:06
 "Confirmation" – 6:53
 "Nayaz" – 3:02
 "Jeremiah" – 6:27
 "Honky Tonk" (Bill Doggett) – 3:55
 "How I Loved You" (Yusef Lateef) – 3:55
 "Morocco" – 4:22

Personnel
Yusef Lateef – flute, tenor saxophone, vocals
Randy Brecker – trumpet
Jim Pugh – trombone, bass trombone
Michael Brecker – tenor saxophone
Jerry Dodgion – alto saxophone
Tom Schuman – piano, electric piano, synthesizer
Jeremy Wall – keyboards, percussion, piano, synthesizer, arranger
Eric Gale – guitar
Will Lee – bass
Steve Gadd, Jimmy Madison – drums
Thomas Bayer – synthesizer drums
Ray Barretto, Sammy Figueroa – percussion
Suzanne Ciani – synthesizer programming

References

CTI Records albums
Yusef Lateef albums
1979 albums
Albums produced by Creed Taylor
Albums recorded at Van Gelder Studio